Rumba is a 2008 comedy film starring Dominique Abel and Fiona Gordon as a married couple who love Latin dancing, and Bruno Romy as a depressed man trying to commit suicide. It was an entry in the International Critics' Week during the 2008 Cannes Film Festival.

Critical reception

With its semi-silent style, the movie was generally well received by the critics. It has a fresh (86%) rating on Rotten Tomatoes.

References

External links
 Official website
 

2008 films
Belgian comedy films
French comedy films
2008 comedy films
2000s French-language films
French-language Belgian films
2000s French films